A nuller is an optical tool used to block a strong source so that fainter signals near that source can be observed. An example of a nuller is being employed on the Keck Interferometer. This causes the light from a star to destructively interfere, effectively cancelling the star's image. As a result, the faint light from a ring of dust orbiting the star can then be detected. This project is part of a scientific effort to detect and observe nearby planets.

Interferometry
Nulling interferometry is a type of interferometry in which two or more signals are mixed to produce observational regions in which the incoming signals cancel themselves out.  This creates a set of virtual "blind spots" which prevent unwanted signals from those areas from interfering with weaker nearby signals.

In 1978 Australian-American astronomer Ronald N. Bracewell suggested using nulling interferometry to search for planets around other stars. This technique was considered for use by both the Terrestrial Planet Finder (a canceled NASA mission) and Darwin (a canceled ESA mission). It is being used on the Keck Interferometer.

A different technique is called a coronagraph, using a physical obstacle to block the unwanted signals.

Experimental nullers
There has been a nuller built by the Jet Propulsion Laboratory that has flown on a NASA sounding rocket twice, once in 2011 and a second time in 2015. There is also a laboratory nuller at NASA Goddard Space Flight Center known as the Visible Nulling Coronagraph (VNC) that is actively conducting experiments.

See also
 Coronagraph
 Interferometry

References

External links
Interferometric Nulling at TNO
Nulling interferometer basics
Tutorial on nulling interferometry
Progress Toward Astronomical Nulling (Criteria governing efficacy of nulling interferometry), Chapter 10 of the Terrestrial Planet Finder (TPF): A NASA Origins Program to Search for Habitable Planets - JPL Publication 99-003, May 1999
Interactive "virtual" interferometer

Observational astronomy
Optical components